Samolus repens is a species of water pimpernel native to Australia, New Zealand and near-by Pacific islands, and South America (South Chile), where it is common in temperate and subtropic coastlines. Common names include creeping brookweed and creeping bushweed. Samolus repens has small white or occasionally pink flowers with a flowering period from September through to March or April.

Taxonomy 
The species was first described by Georg Forster in 1776 as Sheffieldia repens and placed in the genus Samolus in 1805 by Christiaan Hendrik Persoon. The following synonyms exist:

References 

repens
Plants described in 1776
Flora of New Zealand
Flora of Australia